Chikuzen may refer to:
Chikuzen Province, an old province of Japan
Chikuzen, Fukuoka, a present town in Japan